South Brook Farm, also known as the Charles A. Higgins Estate and New Bolton Center for Veterinary Medicine, is a historic estate located in East Marlborough Township, Chester County, Pennsylvania. The original section of the house was built in 1717, and expanded in the 19th century.  In 1940, it was modernized and enlarged by architect R. Brognard Okie in the Colonial Revival style.   Also on the property are a former stable or carriage house transformed into a cottage and photographic studio; an English bank barn; early 20th century terra cotta silo; and one-story garage (1940).

It was originally built as the retirement residence of Caleb Pusey (c. 1650–1727), an associate of William Penn and Quaker leader.  The farm remained in the Pusey family until acquired by industrialist Charles A. Higgins (1882-c. 1956) in 1939–1940.  He hired architect R. Brognard Okie to transform the property into a gentleman's estate. Since 1958, the house has been the centerpiece of the University of Pennsylvania's veterinary and animal research complex known as the New Bolton Center.

It was added to the National Register of Historic Places in 1991.

References

Houses on the National Register of Historic Places in Pennsylvania
Colonial Revival architecture in Pennsylvania
Houses completed in 1940
Houses in Chester County, Pennsylvania
National Register of Historic Places in Chester County, Pennsylvania